The 2021–22 season will be Al Ain Football Club's 48rd in existence and the club's 46st consecutive season in the top-level football league in the UAE.

Club

Technical staff
{| class="wikitable"
|-
! style="color:#FFFFFF; background: #7300E6; border:2px solid #AB9767;"|Position
! style="color:#FFFFFF; background: #7300E6; border:2px solid #AB9767;"|Name
|-
|Head coach
| Serhii Rebrov
|-
|Assistant coach
| Vicente Gómez Ahmed Abdullah
|-
|Assistant coach and analyst
| Alberto Bosch
|-
|Fitness coach
| Jesus Pinedo Alessandro Sarrocco
|-
|Goalkeeping coach	
| Radu Lefter  Dan Zdrinca
|-
|Physiotherapist
| Felipe Perseu
|-
|U-21 team head coach
| Ghazi Fahad
|-
|First and U21 team supervisor
|  Abdullah Al Shamsi

Board of directors

Clean sheets
As of 22 May 2022

Goalscorers

Includes all competitive matches. The list is sorted alphabetically by surname when total goals are equal.

Disciplinary record

|-

Assists
As of 26 May 2022

Hat-tricks

4 – Player scored four goals.

Awards

Pro League Monthly awards

References

External links
 Al Ain FC official website 

2021–22
Emirati football clubs 2021–22 seasons